Mompha terminella is a moth in the family Momphidae found in Europe and North America.

Description
The wingspan is 8–10 mm. Adults are on wing from July to August in one generation per year.

The larvae feed on small enchanter's nightshade (Circaea alpina) and enchanter's nightshade (Circaea lutetiana) mining the leaves of their host plant. The mine starts as a long, narrow, full depth, strongly spiral corridor. The frass is initially deposited in fine grains, but later in a central line. The larva leaves the mine to start elsewhere, either as a continuation of the existing corridor or in a new leaf. This new mine starts as a narrow corridor but soon widens into a large blotch. The frass is deposited in a broad band. Pupation takes place outside of the mine. Larvae can be found from mid-August to mid-September. They are whitish with a light brown head.

Distribution
It is found from Fennoscandia to the Iberian Peninsula and from Ireland to Romania.  It is also found in North America.

References

External links
 Bug Guide
 British leafminers

Momphidae
Leaf miners
Moths described in 1845
Moths of Europe
Moths of North America
Taxa named by Henry Noel Humphreys
Taxa named by John O. Westwood